David Jerome Kupfer (born February 14, 1941) is head of the psychiatry department at the University of Pittsburgh and head of the DSM-5 planning committee. He was awarded the Joseph Zubin Award in 1999.

References

1941 births
Living people
University of Pittsburgh faculty
American psychiatrists
Members of the National Academy of Medicine